In Jamaica, the Leader of the Opposition (officially the Leader of His Majesty's Opposition) is the leader of the largest political party in the House of Representatives that is not in government. The Leader of the Opposition is seen as the alternative Prime Minister and leads the Shadow Cabinet of Jamaica.

Mark Golding was appointed Leader of Opposition on November 11, 2020 following his election as President of the People's National Party

Leaders of the Opposition of Jamaica

See also
Politics of Jamaica
Governor-General of Jamaica
Prime Minister of Jamaica
Shadow Cabinet of Jamaica

References

Politics of Jamaica
Opposition
Jamaica